The United States dropped two atomic bombs on Japan, causing World War II to officially end in Asia on September 2, 1945. At 9:00 on September 9, 1945, the surrender ceremony of World War II in China war zone was held in the auditorium of the Central Army Military Academy in Nanjing, the Republic of China.

General Yasuji Okamura, Commander-in-Chief of the Chinese Expeditionary Force of the Imperial Japanese Army, signed the surrender, expressed unconditional surrender to He Yingqin, the representative of Allies of World War II, and the commander-in-chief of the Chinese Army General Command.

The surrender letter wrote in Japanese and Chinese; the ceremony lasted 15 minutes.

References

Surrenders
Surrender of Japan